Reductoderces is a genus of moths of the Psychidae family. This genus is endemic to New Zealand and the type species is Reductoderces fuscoflava.

Species 
Species in this genus include: 

 Reductoderces araneosa (Meyrick, 1914)
 Reductoderces aucklandica Dugdale, 1971
 Reductoderces cawthronella (Philpott, 1921)
 Reductoderces fuscoflava Salmon & Bradley, 1956
 Reductoderces illustris (Philpott, 1917)
 Reductoderces microphanes (Meyrick, 1888)

References 

Psychidae
Psychidae genera
Taxa named by John Stewart Dugdale
Endemic moths of New Zealand